The Pertubuhan Kebangsaan Melayu Singapura (abbreviation: PKMS; English: Singapore Malay National Organisation) is a political party in Singapore.

History
The origins of Pertubuhan Kebangsaan Melayu Singapura (PKMS) were rooted in the Singapore Malay Union (KMS), which was founded in 1926 by Mohamed Eunos bin Abdullah to represent Malay interests. Following the Second World War, the KMS opposed the proposed Malayan Union and merged into the United Malay National Organisation (UMNO), which would become dominant in federal politics.

Despite the KMS's connections to UMNO, the modern PKMS originated as an extension of the Johor Bahru branch of UMNO. It contested the 1955 Singapore general election and secured one seat at Ulu Bedok. By the 1959 Singapore general election, UMNO had gained three seats in the Malay-dominated electorates of Geylang Serai, Kampung Kembangan, and the Southern Islands. On 20 February 1961, it became officially registered as the Singapore United Malay National Organisation (SUMNO).

SUMNO subsequently joined the Singapore Alliance Party, which also was an extension of the larger federal Alliance Party and encompassed the Singapore Malay Union along with local branches of the Malayan Chinese Association and the Malayan Indian Congress, and former Chief Minister Lim Yew Hock's Singapore People's Alliance. In line with the pro-Malay communal policies of its parent organisation, PKMS became a vocal opponent of Lee Kuan Yew's People's Action Party, which it accused of promoting Chinese chauvinism and discriminating against Malays. However, it also shared some of the PAP's policies, such as supporting merger with Malaysia and anti-Communism.

Under the Singapore Alliance umbrella, SUMNO contested the 1963 general election but performed poorly and lost all its three seats. In total, the Alliance lost all its seven seats. The fallout from this electoral defeat contributed to sharply deteriorating relations between the federal government in Kuala Lumpur and the Singapore state government which culminated in the 1964 race riots that ultimately resulted in Singapore's expulsion from Malaysia in September 1965.

On 19 March 1967, the party assumed its current name, Pertubuhan Kebangsaan Melayu Singapura, after the Singapore government passed a new law banning local parties from operating as branches of foreign organisations. However, PKMS continued to maintain ties with its parent organisation, UMNO. During the 1968 general election, the PKMS did not file any nominations and supported Barisan Sosialis's electoral boycott of the Singapore Parliament. While the PKMS would contest future elections, it has never won a seat since 1959.

On 3 July 2001, the PKMS joined a political coalition known as the Singapore Democratic Alliance, which included the Singapore Justice Party, Singapore People's Party, the Singapore National Front and the National Solidarity Party. Throughout its history, the party has experienced substantial internal infighting. However, it all ended with a court order on 22 March 2012 which gave Abu Mohamed and the Supreme Council the rights to administer the office.

Leadership

References

Further reading

External links
Official website

Malays in Singapore
Political parties of minorities
Political parties in Singapore
1967 establishments in Singapore
Political parties established in 1967